is a Japanese voice actress and former singer who has had roles in several anime series. She is well known for her voice role as Yuki Nagato in The Melancholy of Haruhi Suzumiya and Leon in The iDOLM@STER, while in her musical career, she has been signed under King Records and Lantis. She was born in the city of Utsunomiya, Tochigi and was raised in Saitama. She is affiliated with the talent agency HoriPro International.

Career 

2003
 From April to September, Chihara served as the assistant to Mariko Kōda's OBC radio program Kōda Mariko no GM, a position she gained through an audition. She won first place at the Seiyū Grand Prix Club and the right to work in the avex artist academy.
 In October, she was chosen as one of the top 4 finalists for Pony Canyon, Inc.'s Voice Artist & Singer Audition「VSオーディション2003」 sponsorship contest, but did not win the grand prize.
2004
 From April to September, debuted her voice acting career as Aya Natsume in Tenjho Tenge.
 In December, she began her blog "minorhythm" and at the same time, released her album Heroine
2005

 In April, she began work as a host personality for the internet radio program Oshiyaberi Yattemasu along with Masaya Onosaka and Miyu Matsuki as the Thursday group.
 In May, she began hosting both radio programs Avex presents Chihara Minori no Makenai Radio and Avex presents Chihara Minori no Ikenai Radio.
2006
 Her book minorhythm, based on her blog of the same name, is published in March.
 Chihara voiced the role of Yuki Nagato in The Melancholy of Haruhi Suzumiya for the first time.
 On July 8, she performed with Aya Hirano and Yūko Gotō at Animelo Summer Live 2006 Outride concert.
 In July, The Melancholy of Haruhi Suzumiya'''s ending theme single "Hare Hare Yukai" sung with Aya Hirano and Yūko Gotō reached gold status.
 In November, received the Radio Kansai Award along with Yūko Gotō

2007
 On January 24, released the single "Junpaku Sanctuary", ending a two-year hiatus from her personal singing career.
 On March 18, performed in the Suzumiya Haruhi no Gekisou concert.
 In May, began the radio program in conjunction to her blog called Radio Minorhythm on Wednesdays as part of the Lantis web radio lineup.
 On June 6, released the single "Kimi ga Kureta Anohi". From June 29 to July 2, appeared at Anime Expo 2007 along with Aya Hirano and Yūko Gotō at Long Beach, California as a guest of honor.
 On July 7, performed in the Animelo Summer Live 2007 Generation-A concert.
 On August 16, held a press conference that was broadcast to 115 storefronts across Japan to announce three important news items: the release of her new album Contact on October 24, her tour Live opening on November 18 as part of her birthday concert, and the release of her PV collection DVD slated for December 2007.
 On December 26, released the PV DVD Message 01. A follow-up track to the album Contact titled "Contact 13th" was bundled with the DVD as an extra CD.

2008
 On March 26, released the single "Melty Tale Storage".
 On April 1, her official fanclub m.s.s. (Minori Smile Seasons) was opened.
 On August 6, released the single "Ameagari no Hana yo Sake"
 On August 30, performed at Animelo Summer Live 2008 – Challenge day 1, including a duet with Masami Okui.
 On November 5, released the single "Paradise Lost"
 On November 26, released the album Parade On December 7, performed in the Dream Stage concert at the Fancy Frontier convention held in Taipei, Taiwan.
2009
 On March 29, performed in the Lucky Star Concert Called Lucky Star in Budokan -Anata no Tame Dakara- / らき☆すた in 武道館 あなたのためだから.
 From April to October, she again played the role of Yuki Nagato in the Rebroadcasting of The Melancholy of Haruhi Suzumiya.
 On April 29, performed at the  held at Tokyo Kosei Nenkin Kaikan with music by the Tokyo Philharmonic Orchestra and Philip Chu as conductor.
 On May 3, performed at Ga-Rei Zero – The Live at Shibuya-AX.
 On June 3, released the single "Tomorrow's Chance".
 On July 12, performed in her first ever South East Asian concert in DaiCon 「DaiCon-大コン-」, Multimedia University, Cyberjaya in Malaysia.
 On August 22, performed at Animelo Summer Live 2009 Re:Bridge day 1, including a duet with Yui Horie.
 On December 23, released the single "Precious One".
2010
 On February 4, released the PV DVD Message 02.
 On February 6, she once again played the role of Yuki Nagato in The Disappearance of Haruhi Suzumiya.
 On February 17, released the album Sing All Love.
 On February 24, released the single "Yasashii Bōkyaku"
 On April 10, released the PV DVD Message 03.
 On July 21, released the single "Freedom Dreamer"
 On August 7, released the limited single "Ittōsei"
 On August 29, performed at Animelo Summer Live 2010 Evolution day 2, including a duet with May'n.
2011
 On February 9, released the singles "Defection" and "Key for Life"
 On April 4, released the PV DVD Message 04 On July 6, released the single "Planet Patrol"
 On August 27, performed at Animelo Summer Live 2011 rainbow day 1, including a duet with Yukari Tamura.
 On October 19, released the single "Terminated"
2012
 On February 29, released the album D-Formation On March 21, released the single "Celestial Diva"
 On July 11, released the single "Zone//Alone"
 On August 26, performed at Animelo Summer Live 2012 Infinity day 2, including a duet with Chiaki Ishikawa.
 On October 24, released the single "Self Producer"
2013
 From October to December, played the role of Mitsuki Nase in Beyond the Boundary.
2014
 From April to June, played the role of Miku Izayoi in Date a Live II.
2015
 On April 3, she once again reprised the role of Yuki Nagato in the spin-off series The Disappearance of Nagato Yuki-chan.
 On April 8, she played the role of Kaori Nakaseko in Sound! Euphonium.
2021
 On April 3, she announced her retirement from singing.
 On December 26, she performed her last concert Minori Chihara the Last Live 2021 Re:Contact.
2022
 On April 1, she opened the YouTube Channel Minorhythm.

Personal life

In May 2020, Weekly Flash reported that Chihara was in a six-year relationship with violinist , who was married at the time. Muroya and Chihara admitted to the relationship, though Muroya claimed they ended their relationship in 2016.

 Filmography 

 Anime (films, TV, and web) 
 Samurai Gun (2004), OhanaTenkuu Danzai Skelter Heaven (2004), Ayaka MatsumotoSpace Symphony Maetel: Galaxy Express 999 (2004), Arena
 Tenjho Tenge (2004), Aya Natsume
Reprised in Tenjho Tenge: Ultimate Fight (2005)
 Mars of Destruction (2005) Kurita AoiMy-Otome 0~S.ifr~ (2005-2006), Raquel MayolThe Law of Ueki (2005-2006), Memory
 Fushigiboshi no Futagohime (2005), Lulu
 Major (2005), Ayane
 Binbō Shimai Monogatari (2006), Unnamed girl
 Humanoid Monster Bem (Remake) (2006), Mitsuki Kisaragi
 Lemon Angel Project (2006), Erika Campbell
 Lovedol: Lovely Idol (2006), Hina Hōjō
 The Melancholy of Haruhi Suzumiya (2006-2009), Yuki Nagato - Reprised inLucky Star OVA (2008)Nyoro~n Churuya-san (2009)Suzumiya Haruhi chan no yûutsu (2009)The Disappearance of Haruhi Suzumiya (2010)The Disappearance of Nagato Yuki-chan (2015)
 Murder Princess (Unnamed girl)Kyo no Gononi (2007), Tsubasa KawaiClaymore (2007), Awakened Being in Ep. 12
 Da Capo II (2007-2008), Shirakawa Nanaka
 Dragonaut -The Resonance- (2007), Toa
 Gakuen Utopia Manabi Straight! (2007), Band leader in Ep. 11
 Ikki Tousen: Dragon Destiny (2007-2014), Chouhi Ekitoku
Reprised in Ikki tousen: Extravaganza Epoch (2015)
 Lucky Star (2007) - multiple roles
Minami Iwasaki
Herself in Ep. 12
Waitress, Yuki Nagato in Ep. 16
 Minami-ke (2007-2009, 2013), Chiaki Minami
 Over Drive (2007), Takeshi Yamato's little sister
 Saint October (2007), Seiran in Ep. 6
 Shinkyoku Sōkai Polyphonica (2007), Matia Machiya
 Venus Versus Virus (2007), Sumire Takahana
 Wellber no Monogatari: Sisters of Wellber (2007), Rio
 Ga-rei -Zero- (2008), Kagura Tsuchimiya
Reprised in Tokyo ESP (2014)
 The Tower of Druaga (2008-2009), Coopa
 Needless (2009), Kuchinashi
 Saki (2009), Tōka Ryūmonbuchi
 Umineko no Naku Koro ni (2009), Sakutarou
 Chu-Bra!! (2010), Nayu Hayama
 The Qwaser of Stigmata (2010-2011), Teresa Beria
 Occult Academy (2010), Mikaze Nakagawa
 Yumeiro Patissiere SP Professional (2010), Maize
 Mitsudomoe (2010-2011), Airi Ogata
 Asobi ni iku yo! (2010), Lawry
 Nurarihyon no Mago (2010), Sewagakari no Medanuki
 Rio: Rainbow Gate! (2011), Dana
 A Channel (2011), Kimiko Kitō
Reprised in the OVA A Channel +smile 
 Oniichan no Koto Nanka Zenzen Suki Janain Dakara ne!! (2011), Ran Yatagai
 Horizon on the Middle of Nowhere (2011-2012), Horizon Ariadust
 C³ (2011), Konoha Muramasa
 Hyōka (2012), Yuri KōnosuBusou Shinki Moon Angel (2012), Strarf Mk.2/02
 Queen's Blade Rebellion (2012), Yuit
 Saki Achiga-hen episode of Side-A (2012), Tōka Ryūmonbuchi
 So, I Can't Play H! (2012), Dalnia Earheart
 Busou Shinki – (2012), Strarf Mk.2/Hina
 Oniichan dakedo Ai sae Areba Kankeinai yo ne! (2012), Anastasia Nasuhara
 Sparrow's Hotel (2013), Sayuri Satō
 Beyond the Boundary (2013), Mitsuki Nase - Reprised in the movies:-I'll Be Here- Beyond the Boundary the Movie: The Past (2015)
 -I'll Be Here- Beyond the Boundary the Movie: The Future (2015)
 Phi Brain: Puzzle of God (2013), Rätsel
 Saki (2014), Tōka Ryūmonbuchi
 Nobunaga the Fool (2014), Ichi-hime
 Date A Live (2014-2022), Miku Izayoi
 Rail Wars! (2014), Noa Kashima
 Cross Ange (2014), Miranda Campbell
 Girl Friend Beta (2014), Mahiro Natsume
 Hibike! Euphonium (2015), Kaori NakasekoViolet Evergarden (2018), Erica BrownMy Hero Academia (2018-2020), Camie Utsushimi
 Princess Connect! Re:Dive (2020-2022), Tomo / Tomo MikumaSmile of the Arsnotoria the Animation (2022), Lidel

 Game 
 Avalon Code (Neaki)
 Azur Lane (Z46)
 Busou Shinki BATTLE RONDO (Strarf)
 étude prologue ～Yureugoku Kokoro no Katachi～ (Asami Hagiwara)
 Granblue Fantasy (Orchis)
 Final Fantasy Type-0 (Cater)
 Final Fantasy Type-0 HD (Cater)
 Haruhi Suzumiya series as Yuki Nagato:
 The Promise of Haruhi Suzumiya (PSP)
 The Perplexity of Haruhi Suzumiya (PS2)
 The Excitement of Haruhi Suzumiya (Wii)
 The Series of Haruhi Suzumiya (NDS)
 The Parallel of Haruhi Suzumiya (Wii)
 The Idolmaster One For All (Leon)
 Ikki Tousen series as Chouhi Ekitoku:
 Ikki Tousen: Shining Dragon (PS2)
 Ikki Tousen: Eloquent Fist (PSP)
 Lucky ☆ Star: Ryōō Gakuen Ōtōsai (Minami Iwasaki)
 Lux-Pain (Natsuki Venefsukja)
 Mars of Destruction (Aoi Kurita)
 Memories Off No. 5 encore (Akina Ichijo)
 Shōkan Shōjo -ElementalGirl Calling- (Uzuki)
 Summon Night X: Tears Crown (Phara Mir Celestia)
 Tenkuu Danzai Skelter Heaven (Ayaka Matsumoto)
 The Kōshōnin (Lina Hanashita)
 Blaze Union: Story to Reach the Future (Eater, Lapis)
 Princess Connect! Re:Dive (Tomo)
 Rune Factory 3 (Sofia)
 Final Promise Story (Sasha) Gloria Union (Raspberry, Eater)
 Otomedius Excellent (Strarf)
 Chaos Rings II (Lessica)
 Disgaea D2: A Brighter Darkness (Barbara)
 Date A Live: Ars Install (Miku Izayoi)
 Another Eden (Cynthia)
 Kirara Fantasia (Mint)
 Girls X Battle (Matador)
 Pokémon Masters EX (Courtney)

 Drama CD 

 B Gata H Kei (Kyouka Kanejyou)
 Dragon Nest: Prelude~ Awakening of Fate (Goddess Altea)
 Franken Fran (Veronica Madaraki)
 Lovedol: Lovely Idol (Hina Hōjō)
 The Melancholy of Haruhi Suzumiya: Sound Around (Yuki Nagato)
 My-HiME Destiny (Mayo Kagura) 
 Shin Megami Tensei: Devil Survivor (Tanikawa Yuzu)

 Radio 
 Kōda Mariko no GM (April to September 2003)
 avex presents Chihara Minori no Makenai Radio (JOQR, Ended)
 avex presents Chihara Minori no Ikenai Radio (JOQR, Ended)
 SOS Dan Radio Shibu (Ended)
 Oshaberi Yattemasu Thursdays (Graduated)
 Chihara Minori radio minorhythm (Still running)

 Chihara Minori's fans Contact (A&G Super RADIO SHOW 〜AniSuper〜: October 6, 2007, to October 27, 2007)
 Ga-rei -Zero- Supernatural Disaster Countermeasure Radio Room (Lantis web radio: October 18, 2008)
 Busou Shinki It is the radio for master. (Onsen web radio: September 24, 2012, still running)

 Live events 
 Debut 1st Anniversary Commemoration Event: Minorin Spring Celebration 2005 (April 10, 2005)
 Birthday Event: Minorin Birthday Celebration 2005 (November 20, 2005)
 Debut 2nd Anniversary Commemoration Event: Minorin Spring Celebration 2006 (April 22, 2006)
 Love Live 2006: Minori Chihara Birthday (November 18, 2006)
 I Melody: Minori Chihara Birthday Live 2007 (November 18, 2007)
 Starchild Presents: Starchild Collection
 Minori Chihara 1st Live Tour 2008: Contact/Re:Birth (March 9, March 16, March 22, March 23)
 Minori Chihara Live Tour 2009: Parade (February–March 2009)
 Minori Chihara Live at DaiCon (Malaysia) 「DaiCon-大コン-」 (July 11–12, 2009)
 Minori Chihara Live 2009 "Summer Camp" (August 1–2, 2009)
 Minori Chihara Final & Countdown Live 2009–2010 (December 31, 2009)
 Minori Chihara Live 2010 "Sing All Love" (April 10 – May 30, 2010)
 Minori Chihara Live 2010 "Summer Camp 2" (August 11–12, 2010)
 Minori Chihara Live 2010 "Invasion Tour" (October 9, 2010)
 Minori Chihara Xmas Party 2010 (December 25, 2010)
 Minori Chihara Film Live (February 9, 2011)
 Minori Chihara Live 2011 "Key for Defection" (May 2–8, 2011)
 Minori Chihara Live 2011 "Summer Camp 3" (August 5–7, 2011)
 Minori Chihara Final & Countdown Live 2011–2012 (December 31, 2011)
 Minori Chihara Acoustic Live "A-Formation" (February 29, 2012)
 Minori Chihara Live 2012 "D-Formation" (April 7 – May 27, 2012)
 Minori Chihara Ultra Formation/Party Formation (June 16–17, 2012)
 Minori Chihara Live 2012 "Summer Camp 4" (August 4–5, 2012)
 Minori Chihara Birthday Live (November 18, 2012)

 Additional work 
 Blister Pack V♀ices

 True Love: Winter Best Songs (Commercial narration)
 True Love: Spring Memorial Songs (Commercial narration)
 Natsu Monogatari: Summer Best Songs (Commercial narration)

 Discography 

 Singles 

 Albums 

 Character singles 

 DVD 
 Message 01, released December 26, 2007
 Minori Chihara 1st Live Tour 2008 Contact DVD, released June 25, 2008
 Message 02, released February 4, 2009
 Minori Chihara Live Tour 2009 Parade DVD, released June 24, 2009
 Message 03, released April 10, 2010
 Minori Chihara Live Tour 2010:Sing All Love DVD, released November 10, 2010
 Minori Chihara Summer Camp 2 DVD, released February 23, 2011
 Message 04, released April 4, 2012

 Book 
 Minorhythm'', published March 30, 2006

See also 
 List of J-pop artists

References

External links 
  
 Official agency profile 
 Official blog (Before 1st April 2013) 
 Official blog (After 1st April 2013) 
 Radio Minorhythm 
 

1980 births
21st-century Japanese actresses
21st-century Japanese women singers
21st-century Japanese singers
Living people
Anime singers
Horipro artists
Japanese women pop singers
Japanese radio personalities
Japanese video game actresses
Japanese voice actresses
Lantis (company) artists
Musicians from Tochigi Prefecture
People from Utsunomiya, Tochigi
Voice actresses from Tochigi Prefecture